Piskaryovskoye Memorial Cemetery is located in Saint Petersburg, on the Avenue of the Unvanquished (Проспект Непокорённых), dedicated mostly to the victims of the siege of Leningrad.

Memorial complex
The memorial complex designed by Alexander Vasiliev and Yevgeniy Levinson was opened on May 9, 1960. About 420,000 civilians and 50,000 soldiers of the Leningrad Front were buried in 186 mass graves. Near the entrance an eternal flame is located. A marble plate affirms that from September 4, 1941 to January 22, 1944 107,158 air bombs were dropped on the city, 148,478 shells were fired, 16,744 men died, 33,782 were wounded and 641,803 died of starvation.

The center of the architectural composition is the bronze monument symbolizing the Mother Motherland, by sculptors Vera Isaeva and Robert Taurit.

By granite steps leading down from the eternal flame visitors enter the main 480-meter path which leads to the majestic Motherland monument. The words of poet Olga Berggolts are carved on a granite wall located behind this monument:

External links
 
 museum.ru website
 
 Album of photographs
 Photographs from the Siege Museum
 Photographs and Videos of the Cemetery

Cemeteries in Saint Petersburg
Tourist attractions in Saint Petersburg
Bronze sculptures in Russia
World War II memorials in Russia
Soviet military memorials and cemeteries
1960 establishments in the Soviet Union
Cultural heritage monuments of federal significance in Saint Petersburg